Natica multipunctata is a species of predatory sea snail, a marine gastropod mollusk in the family Naticidae, the moon snails.

Description

Distribution
This marine species occurs in the Atlantic Ocean off West Africa, the Cape Verdes and Angola.

References

Naticidae
Gastropods described in 1825
Molluscs of the Atlantic Ocean
Molluscs of Angola
Gastropods of Cape Verde